The Biseni Forest is a freshwater swamp forest located in the north west of Ahoada and the west of Upper Orashi Forest in the Taylor Creek floodplain of the Niger Delta. The forest has an area of 219 square kilometers (85 sq mi), a birdwatching site, with a relevant record of migratory and aquatic birds.

Flora
Biseni Forest is a swampy woodland that may run dry during the dry season but quickly becomes a flooded forest due to heavy rainfall during the wet season. Raffia palms and some woody broadleaved species such as Symphonia globulifera and Ficus spp. are found here. There are also areas of tall grass swamps close to the river channels.

Fauna
The forest is home to many birds and mammals including the nationally rare or uncommon species.

References

Forests of Rivers State
Important Bird Areas of Nigeria